The Malayan flying barb (Esomus malayensis) is a species of cyprinid found in Malaysia and Vietnam.

References

Fish of Malaysia
Fish of Vietnam
Fish described in 1923
Esomus